Joe Ford (born May 7, 1947) is an American jazz saxophonist.

Early life and education 
Ford was born in Buffalo, New York. He studied saxophone under Makanda Ken McIntyre, Jackie McLean, and Frank Foster, and percussion under Joe Chambers. He earned his bachelor's degree in music education in 1968 from Central State University.

Career 
After graduating from college, Ford taught in Buffalo Public Schools from 1968 to 1972. While working at the Buffalo Public Library in 1974 and 1975, Ford played in the Birthright Ensemble, then  with McCoy Tyner in 1976. Since the early-1980s, he has worked extensively as a sideman, playing with Sam Jones, Lester Bowie, Jimmy Owens, Idris Muhammad, Abdullah Ibrahim, Chico O'Farrill, Saheb Sarbib (1984), Avery Sharpe (1988), Jerry Gonzalez (from 1988), Larry Willis (1989), Michael Logan (1990),  Malachi Thompson (1991), John Blake (1992), Ronnie Burrage (1993), Hannibal Marvin Peterson (1993), Freddie Cole (1993), Steve Berrios (1995), and Nova Bossa Nova (1997).

In the late-1990s, Ford led two ensembles, the Black Art Sax Quartet and a big band group called The Thing.  He has released one album as a leader, 1993's Today's Night on Blue Moon Records.  It features Charles Fambrough, Kenny Kirkland and Jeff "Tain" Watts.

Discography

As leader
1993: Today's Night

As sideman
With Nova Bossa Nova
Jazz Influence (1997)
With Malachi Thompson
The Jaz Life (Delmark, 1992)
New Standards (Delmark, 1993)
47th Street (Delmark, 1997)
Freebop Now! (Delmark, 1998)
With McCoy Tyner
Focal Point ((Milestone, 1976)
Inner Voices ((Milestone, 1977)
The Greeting ((Milestone, 1978)
Horizon ((Milestone, 1979)
13th House ((Milestone, 1981)
Uptown/Downtown (Milestone, 1988)
The Turning Point (Birdology, 1992)
Journey (Birdology, 1993)
With Larry Willis
Heavy Blue (SteepleChase, 1980)
Blue Fable (HighNote, 2007)

References
Footnotes

Further Reading
Gary W. Kennedy, "Joe Ford", Grove Jazz online.

American jazz alto saxophonists
American jazz soprano saxophonists
American male saxophonists
Musicians from New York (state)
1947 births
Living people
21st-century American saxophonists
21st-century American male musicians
American male jazz musicians
Nova Bossa Nova members